Ostrowo may refer to:

In Warmian-Masurian Voivodeship (north Poland):
Ostrowo, Warmian-Masurian Voivodeship

In Pomeranian Voivodeship (north Poland):
Ostrowo, Puck County
Ostrowo, Bytów County
Ostrowo, Kartuzy County

In Kuyavian-Pomeranian Voivodeship (north-central Poland):
Ostrowo, Gmina Gniewkowo
Ostrowo, Mogilno County
Ostrowo, Nakło County
Ostrowo, Tuchola County
Ostrowo, Wąbrzeźno County

In Greater Poland Voivodeship (west-central Poland):
Ostrowo, Gostyń County
Ostrowo, Konin County
Ostrowo, Słupca County
Ostrowo, Śrem County
Ostrów Wielkopolski, Ostrów Wielkopolski County (formerly known in German as Ostrowo)

Elsewhere:
Ostrowo, Podlaskie Voivodeship (north-east Poland)

See also
Ostrów (disambiguation)